Vladimir Pešić is a scientist from Montenegro, a biologist who is an expert on Hydrachnidiae, the water mites, and a co-author taxon authority for a new species of freshwater snail Valvata montenegrina Glöer & Pešić, 2008 (Valvatidae, Gastropoda). Pešić works in the Department of Biology at the University of Montenegro, at Podgorica.

Dr Vladimir Pešić, along with his team, has discovered a new species of Litarachna in Puerto Rico and named it Litarachna lopezae, after Jennifer Lopez.

Marine species described by Pešić
The World Register of Marine Species lists the following species 
 Litarachna antalyaensis Pešić, Durucan & Chatterjee, 2018
 Litarachna bruneiensis Pesic, Chatterjee, Marshall & Pavicevic, 2011
 Litarachna caribica Pesic, Chatterjee & Schizas, 2008
 Litarachna enigmatica Pešić, Durucan & Chatterjee, 2018
 Litarachna muratsezgini Pešić, Durucan & Zawal, 2019
 Litarachna smiti Pesic, Chatterjee, Ahmed Abada, 2008
 Pontarachna arabica Pesic, Chatterjee & Ahmed Abada, 2008
 Pontarachna nemethi Pesic, Chatterjee & Schizas, 2012
 Pontarachna turcica Pešić, Durucan & Zawal, 2019

References

Ecologists
21st-century zoologists
Montenegrin scientists
Year of birth missing (living people)
Living people
Arachnologists
Montenegrin Malacologists
Academic staff of the University of Montenegro